On Arrival is the eighth studio album by American country music artist Dan Seals. The album reached #13 on the Top Country Albums chart. "Love on Arrival" and "Good Times" were the first two singles which both reached #1 while the last two singles, "Bordertown" and "Water Under the Bridge" only reached #49 and #57, respectively. "Good Times", which was his last #1 single and last Top 40 hit, was originally performed by Sam Cooke. "Made for Lovin' You" was also recorded by Clinton Gregory on his 1990 debut album Music 'n Me, and would later be a Top Ten hit for Doug Stone who released it from his 1992 album From the Heart.

Track listing

Personnel
Adapted from liner notes.

Eddie Bayers - drums (tracks 1, 2, 6, 8, 10)
Barry Beckett - piano (track 1)
Larry Byrom - acoustic guitar (tracks 4, 5, 9), electric guitar (tracks 1, 2, 6-8, 10), electric slide guitar (track 3)
Beth Nielsen Chapman - background vocals (tracks 5, 9), vocal responses (track 5)
John Condon - hand claps (track 1)
Bill Cuomo - electric piano (track 9), synthesizer (track 3), Wurlitzer (track 5)
Paul Franklin - steel guitar (tracks 5, 9, 10), lap steel guitar (track 3)
Steve Gibson - electric guitar (track 2), gut string guitar (track 5)
Vince Gill - background vocals (track 6)
Kenny Greenberg - electric guitar (track 1)
Doyle Grisham - steel guitar (tracks 2, 6, 8, 10)
Jim Horn - baritone saxophone (track 3), tenor saxophone (track 1) 
Sheri Huffman - background vocals (tracks 2, 5, 7)
David Hungate - bass guitar (all tracks except 2 & 8)
John Barlow Jarvis - electric piano (tracks 4, 7)
Wendy Suits Johnson - background vocals (track 5)
Shane Keister - piano (track 10), synthesizer (tracks 2, 6, 8, 10)
Mike Lawler - electric percussion (track 3), organ (tracks 1, 3), piano (track 8), synthesizer (tracks 6-8), synth horns (track 7), tambourine (track 7)
Kyle Lehning - electric guitar (tracks 8, 9), synthesizer (tracks 2, 4, 9, 10), hand claps (track 1)
Paul Leim - drums (tracks 3-5, 7, 9)
Brent Mason - electric guitar (track 7)
Terry McMillan - congas (track 1), harmonica (track 3), knee (track 8), shaker (track 3), tambourine (tracks 1, 8)
Farrell Morris - African talking drum (track 4), castanets (track 5), congas (track 10), cymbal (track 10), marimba (track 5), shaker (track 5), triangle (track 10)
Mark O'Connor - fiddle (track 4)
Jim Photogolo - background vocals (tracks 5, 9)
Hargus "Pig" Robbins - piano (tracks 2, 4, 6, 9)
Brent Rowan - electric guitar (tracks 3-5, 7, 9)
Dan Seals - lead vocals (all tracks), background vocals (all tracks), hand claps (track 1)
Lisa Silver - background vocals (tracks 2, 5, 7)
Joe Stanley - 12-string guitar (tracks 7, 8), acoustic guitar (tracks 2, 4, 6-8, 10), electric guitar (tracks 4-10), mandolin (track 4)
Harry Stinson - background vocals (tracks 5, 9)
Billy Thomas - background vocals (track 6)
Diane Vanette - background vocals (tracks 2, 7)
Billy Joe Walker Jr. - acoustic guitar (tracks 2, 3, 5, 6, 8, 9), electric guitar (track 10)
Bob Wray - bass guitar (tracks 2, 8)

Chart performance

Weekly charts

Year-end charts

Singles

References

1990 albums
Dan Seals albums
Capitol Records albums
Albums produced by Kyle Lehning